The 2018 Tour de Langkawi was the 23rd edition of an annual professional road bicycle racing stage race held in Malaysia since 1996. The race was run at the highest category apart from those races which make up the UCI World Tour, and was rated by the Union Cycliste Internationale (UCI) as a 2.HC (hors category) race as part of the 2018 UCI Asia Tour.

Teams

23 teams accepted invitations to participate in the 2017 Tour de Langkawi. The field was completed by one national selection teams. Each team had a maximum of six riders.

Route

Stages

Stage 1

Stage 2

Stage 3

Stage 4

Stage 5

Stage 6

Stage 7

Stage 8

Classification leadership table

Final standings

General classification

Points classification

Mountains classification

Asian rider classification

Team classification

Asian team classification

Riders who failed to finish

References

External links
Official Website
Pro Cycling Stats

2018
2018 UCI Asia Tour
2018 in Malaysian sport